Michael Watts Gulan (born December 18, 1970) is an American former professional baseball third baseman. He played during two seasons at the major league level for the St. Louis Cardinals and Florida Marlins of Major League Baseball (MLB), and for the Yokohama BayStars of Nippon Professional Baseball (NPB).

Career
Gulan was drafted by the Cardinals in the second round of the 1992 MLB draft after playing collegiately at Kent State University from 1990 to 1992.

External links
, or Retrosheet, or Pelota Binaria (Venezuelan Winter League)

1970 births
Living people
American expatriate baseball players in Canada
American expatriate baseball players in Japan
Arkansas Travelers players
Baseball players from Ohio
Bristol White Sox players
Calgary Cannons players
Cardenales de Lara players
American expatriate baseball players in Venezuela
Florida Marlins players
Hamilton Redbirds players
Kent State Golden Flashes baseball players
Louisville Redbirds players
Major League Baseball third basemen
Nashville Sounds players
Nippon Professional Baseball third basemen
Portland Sea Dogs players
Sportspeople from Steubenville, Ohio
Springfield Cardinals players
St. Louis Cardinals players
St. Petersburg Cardinals players
Yokohama BayStars players